Nikolay Platonovich Andreyev (October 1, 1882 – April 13, 1947) was a pioneering Russian photographer and photo artist.

Early life 
Nikolay Andreyev was born at 1-st of October 1882 in Serpukhov. He had three sisters and one brother. By his autobiography, his father Platon Andreyevich Andreyev was a hairdresser and his mother Elizaveta Mihailovna was a laundress. But this is not true.  It was dangerous to show noble or merchant origin in the 1920s and 1930s. In fact, Platon Andreyevich was a rather successful merchant and had barbershop, laundry and tea room. At 1902 Platon Andreyevich was documented as a merchant of the second guild and had a two-store brick house at 1-Moskovskaya street in Serpukhov. He had bought or built this house in the late nineteenth.

Nikolay Andreyev was educated at Serpukhov modern school and his sisters at a gymnasium. His father hoped that Nikolay would take on his business, but his father's dreams would never come to pass.

Nikolay had been from childhood attracted by painting and drawing, and later by photography. Besides that, he played clarinet and flute. Nikolay especially liked flute and had several ancient silver flutes. Nikolay performed musical compositions of Gluck, Vivaldi and Bach. Other hobbies of Nikolay Andreyev were ballroom dances and motor-cycle races. At 1911 on a ballroom dances contest organized by Firefighters Society of Serpukhov he took the first place and valuable desk set. Nikolay had a BMW motorcycle.

After graduating from modern school and conflicting with his father, Nikolay Andreyev left his father's home and launched his own photographer's studio in the old part of Serpukhov, near modern Lunacharsky Street. His photographic business was successful and gave financial independence to him.

References

External links 
 
 Мемориальный дом-музей Н. П. Андреева
 Николай Андреев — знаменитый русский фотограф (1882—1947)
 Nikolay  Andreyev (1882—1947) Pictorial photography
 Pictorial Photography by  Andreev
 История фотографии. Андреев Н. П.

1882 births
1947 deaths
Russian photographers
People from Serpukhov
Pictorialists
Soviet photographers